Hasan Su (also Romanized as Ḩasan Sū) is a village in Howmeh Rural District, in the Central District of Maneh and Samalqan County, North Khorasan Province, Iran. At the 2006 census, its population was 728, in 178 families.

References 

Populated places in Maneh and Samalqan County